

The Bartlett LC-13A Zephyr 150 was a United States light civil aircraft built in the 1940s. It was a mid-wing braced monoplane of conventional design with side-by-side seating for two and fixed, tailwheel undercarriage. It was originally marketed as the Babcock LC-13 by its original manufacturer, then as the Taubman LC-13 when the Babcock Airplane Corporation was acquired by Taubman Aircraft. The rights were finally acquired by Bartlett Aircraft in 1941, but plans to mass-produce it were halted by the outbreak of World War II.  There was a brief attempt to revive the design at the end of the war, but nothing came of this.

Specifications (LC-13A Zephyr 150)

See also
California during World War II

References

Further reading

External links
 aerofiles.com

1940s United States civil utility aircraft
Zephyr
Single-engined tractor aircraft
High-wing aircraft